Samuel Adolphus Madison, Jr. (born April 23, 1974) is an American football coach and former cornerback who is the cornerbacks coach and pass game specialist for the Miami Dolphins of the National Football League (NFL). He previously served as the secondary/cornerbacks coach for the Kansas City Chiefs.  He played college football at the University of Louisville, and was drafted by the Miami Dolphins in the second round of the 1997 NFL Draft.  A four-time Pro Bowl selection, Madison also played for the New York Giants.  He has won two Super Bowls, Super Bowl XLII as a player with the Giants and Super Bowl LIV as an assistant coach with the Chiefs.

Early years
Madison attended Florida A&M University Developmental Research School where he played wide receiver and defensive back. Aside from football he also lettered in basketball, baseball and track and field.

College career
Madison played college football for the University of Louisville. Madison was a three-year starter for the Cardinals and set the school records for interceptions with 16 and passes defended with 44. As a junior, he earned third-team All-America selection after recording 65 tackles, two sacks, 13 passes defensed and seven interceptions. As a senior, he was named a second-team All-America and first-team All-Conference USA after finishing with 52 tackles, two sacks, six interceptions and 16 passes defensed.

Professional career

Miami Dolphins
The Miami Dolphins selected Madison in the second round (44th overall) of the 1997 NFL Draft. Madison was the eighth cornerback drafted in 1997.

Madison made the Pro Bowl for four straight years from 1999 to 2002. On March 1, 2006 the Dolphins released him. He finished his career with the Dolphins starting 127 of 138 games, recording 353 tackles, a sack, 31 interceptions and two touchdowns.

For much of his career as a Miami Dolphin, Sam Madison played alongside fellow cornerback Patrick Surtain. During their time together, Madison and Surtain were one of the most prolific cornerback tandems in NFL history, posting a combined 697 tackles, 7.5 sacks, 60 interceptions, and 2 touchdowns.

New York Giants
Madison  signed a four-year contract with the New York Giants on March 10, 2006. He earned a Super Bowl ring with the Giants in Super Bowl XLII against the New England Patriots.

Madison appeared in just seven games for the Giants in 2008, recording eight tackles and an interception. He was placed on season-ending injured reserve with a broken ankle on December 30. He was released on February 9, 2009.

NFL statistics

Regular Season

Coaching career

Kansas City Chiefs
On February 19, 2019, Madison was hired as the secondary and cornerbacks coach of the Kansas City Chiefs. In his first year as coach, Madison won Super Bowl LIV against the San Francisco 49ers. The Super Bowl win was his second win and first as a coach.

Miami Dolphins
On February 18, 2022, the Miami Dolphins announced they hired Madison as their cornerbacks coach and pass game coordinator.

Personal
Madison and his wife, Saskia, have two sons, Kellen and Kaden, and a daughter Kennedy. He donated a kidney to his daughter, who was three days shy of her 11th birthday, when both of hers were failing in 2016. His house was featured on an episode of MTV Cribs.  In 2019, Madison worked for WTVX as a Miami Dolphins analyst.

References

External links
Official Website
New York Giants bio

1974 births
Living people
American Conference Pro Bowl players
American football cornerbacks
Kansas City Chiefs coaches
Louisville Cardinals football players
Miami Dolphins players
New York Giants players
People from Thomasville, Georgia
Players of American football from Georgia (U.S. state)
Miami Dolphins coaches